Tegra is a system on a chip (SoC) series developed by Nvidia for mobile devices such as smartphones, personal digital assistants, and mobile Internet devices. The Tegra integrates an ARM architecture central processing unit (CPU), graphics processing unit (GPU), northbridge, southbridge, and memory controller onto one package. Early Tegra SoCs are designed as efficient multimedia processors. The Tegra-line evolved to emphasize performance for gaming and machine learning applications without sacrificing power efficiency, before taking a drastic shift in direction towards platforms that provide vehicular automation with the applied "Nvidia Drive" brand name on reference boards and its semiconductors; and with the "Nvidia Jetson" brand name for boards adequate for AI applications within e.g. robots or drones, and for various smart high level automation purposes.

History 
The Tegra APX 2500 was announced on February 12, 2008. The Tegra 6xx product line was revealed on June 2, 2008, and the APX 2600 was announced in February 2009. The APX chips were designed for smartphones, while the Tegra 600 and 650 chips were intended for smartbooks and mobile Internet devices (MID).

The first product to use the Tegra was Microsoft's Zune HD media player in September 2009, followed by the Samsung M1. Microsoft's Kin was the first cellular phone to use the Tegra; however, the phone did not have an app store, so the Tegra's power did not provide much advantage. In September 2008, Nvidia and Opera Software announced that they would produce a version of the Opera 9.5 browser optimized for the Tegra on Windows Mobile and Windows CE. At Mobile World Congress 2009, Nvidia introduced its port of Google's Android to the Tegra.

On January 7, 2010, Nvidia officially announced and demonstrated its next generation Tegra system-on-a-chip, the Nvidia Tegra 250, at Consumer Electronics Show 2010. Nvidia primarily supports Android on Tegra 2, but booting other ARM-supporting operating systems is possible on devices where the bootloader is accessible. Tegra 2 support for the Ubuntu Linux distribution was also announced on the Nvidia developer forum.

Nvidia announced the first quad-core SoC at the February 2011 Mobile World Congress event in Barcelona. Though the chip was codenamed Kal-El, it is now branded as Tegra 3. Early benchmark results show impressive gains over Tegra 2, and the chip was used in many of the tablets released in the second half of 2011.

In January 2012, Nvidia announced that Audi had selected the Tegra 3 processor for its In-Vehicle Infotainment systems and digital instruments display. The processor will be integrated into Audi's entire line of vehicles worldwide, beginning in 2013. The process is ISO 26262-certified.

In summer of 2012 Tesla Motors began shipping the Model S all electric, high performance sedan, which contains two NVIDIA Tegra 3D Visual Computing Modules (VCM). One VCM powers the 17-inch touchscreen infotainment system, and one drives the 12.3-inch all digital instrument cluster."

In March 2015, Nvidia announced the Tegra X1, the first SoC to have a graphics performance of 1 teraflop. At the announcement event, Nvidia showed off Epic Games' Unreal Engine 4 "Elemental" demo, running on a Tegra X1.

On October 20, 2016, Nvidia announced that the Nintendo Switch hybrid video game console will be powered by Tegra hardware. On March 15, 2017, TechInsights revealed the Nintendo Switch is powered by a custom Tegra X1 (model T210), with lower clockspeeds.

Specifications

Tegra APX 
 Tegra APX 2500
 Processor: ARM11 600 MHz MPCore (originally GeForce ULV)
 Suffix: APX (formerly CSX)
 Memory: NOR or NAND flash, Mobile DDR
 Graphics: Image processor (FWVGA 854×480 pixels)
 Up to 12 megapixels camera support
 LCD controller supports resolutions up to 1280×1024
 Storage: IDE for SSD
 Video codecs: up to 720p MPEG-4 AVC/H.264 and VC-1 decoding
 Includes GeForce ULV support for OpenGL ES 2.0, Direct3D Mobile, and programmable shaders
 Output: HDMI, VGA, composite video, S-Video, stereo jack, USB
 USB On-The-Go
 Tegra APX 2600
 Enhanced NAND flash
 Video codecs:
 720p H.264 Baseline Profile encode or decode
 720p VC-1/WMV9 Advanced Profile decode
 D-1 MPEG-4 Simple Profile encode or decode

Tegra 6xx 
 Tegra 600
 Targeted for GPS segment and automotive
 Processor: ARM11 700 MHz MPCore
 Memory: low-power DDR (DDR-333, 166 MHz)
 SXGA, HDMI, USB, stereo jack
 HD camera 720p
 Tegra 650
 Targeted for GTX of handheld and notebook
 Processor: ARM11 800 MHz MPCore
 Low power DDR (DDR-400, 200 MHz)
 Less than 1 watt envelope
 HD image processing for advanced digital still camera and HD camcorder functions
 Display supports 1080p at 24 frame/s, HDMI v1.3, WSXGA+ LCD and CRT, and NTSC/PAL TV output
 Direct support for Wi-Fi, disk drives, keyboard, mouse, and other peripherals
 A complete board support package (BSP) to enable fast time to market for Windows Mobile-based designs

Tegra 2 

The second generation Tegra SoC has a dual-core ARM Cortex-A9 CPU, an ultra low power (ULP) GeForce GPU, a 32-bit memory controller with either LPDDR2-600 or DDR2-667 memory, a 32KB/32KB L1 cache per core and a shared 1MB L2 cache. Tegra 2's Cortex A9 implementation does not include ARM's SIMD extension, NEON. There is a version of the Tegra 2 SoC supporting 3D displays; this SoC uses a higher clocked CPU and GPU.

The Tegra 2 video decoder is largely unchanged from the original Tegra and has limited support for HD formats. The lack of support for high-profile H.264 is particularly troublesome when using online video streaming services.

Common features:
 CPU cache: L1: 32 KB instruction + 32 KB data, L2: 1 MB
 40 nm semiconductor technology

1 Pixel shaders : Vertex shaders : Texture mapping units : Render output units

Devices

Tegra 3 

NVIDIA's Tegra 3 (codenamed "Kal-El") is functionally a SoC with a quad-core ARM Cortex-A9 MPCore CPU, but includes a fifth "companion" core in what Nvidia refers to as a "variable SMP architecture". While all cores are Cortex-A9s, the companion core is manufactured with a low-power silicon process. This core operates transparently to applications and is used to reduce power consumption when processing load is minimal. The main quad-core portion of the CPU powers off in these situations.

Tegra 3 is the first Tegra release to support ARM's SIMD extension, NEON.

The GPU in Tegra 3 is an evolution of the Tegra 2 GPU, with 4 additional pixel shader units and higher clock frequency. It can also output video up to 2560×1600 resolution and supports 1080p MPEG-4 AVC/h.264 40 Mbit/s High-Profile, VC1-AP, and simpler forms of MPEG-4 such as DivX and Xvid.

The Tegra 3 was released on November 9, 2011.

Common features:
 CPU cache: L1: 32 KB instruction + 32 KB data, L2: 1 MB
 40 nm LPG semiconductor technology by TSMC

1 Pixel shaders : Vertex shaders : Texture mapping units : Render output units

Devices

Tegra 4 
The Tegra 4 (codenamed "Wayne") was announced on January 6, 2013, and is a SoC with a quad-core CPU, but includes a fifth low-power Cortex A15 companion core which is invisible to the OS and performs background tasks to save power. This power-saving configuration is referred to as "variable SMP architecture" and operates like the similar configuration in Tegra 3.

The GeForce GPU in Tegra 4 is again an evolution of its predecessors. However, numerous feature additions and efficiency improvements were implemented. The number of processing resources was dramatically increased, and clock rate increased as well. In 3D tests, the Tegra 4 GPU is typically several times faster than that of Tegra 3. Additionally, the Tegra 4 video processor has full support for hardware decoding and encoding of WebM video (up to 1080p 60Mbit/s @ 60fps).

Along with Tegra 4, Nvidia also introduced i500, an optional software modem based on Nvidia's acquisition of Icera, which can be reprogrammed to support new network standards. It supports category 3 (100Mbit/s) LTE but will later be updated to Category 4 (150Mbit/s).

Common features:
 CPU cache: L1: 32 KB instruction + 32 KB data, L2: 2 MB
 28 nm HPL semiconductor technology

1 Pixel shaders : Vertex shaders : Pixel pipelines (pairs 1x TMU and 1x ROP)

Devices

Tegra 4i 
The Tegra 4i (codenamed "Grey") was announced on February 19, 2013. With hardware support for the same audio and video formats, but using Cortex-A9 cores instead of Cortex-A15, the Tegra 4i is a low-power variant of the Tegra 4 and is designed for phones and tablets. Unlike its Tegra 4 counterpart, the Tegra 4i also integrates the Icera i500 LTE/HSPA+ baseband processor onto the same die.

Common features:
 28 nm HPM semiconductor technology
 CPU cache: L1: 32 KB instruction + 32 KB data, L2: 1 MB

1 Pixel shaders : Vertex shaders : Pixel pipelines (pairs 1x TMU and 1x ROP)

Devices

Tegra K1 
Nvidia's Tegra K1 (codenamed "Logan") features ARM Cortex-A15 cores in a 4+1 configuration similar to Tegra 4, or Nvidia's 64-bit Project Denver dual-core processor as well as a Kepler graphics processing unit with support for Direct3D 12, OpenGL ES 3.1, CUDA 6.5, OpenGL 4.4/OpenGL 4.5, and Vulkan. Nvidia claims that it outperforms both the Xbox 360 and the PS3, whilst consuming significantly less power.

Support Adaptive Scalable Texture Compression.

In late April 2014, Nvidia shipped the "Jetson TK1" development board containing a Tegra K1 SoC and running Ubuntu Linux.
 Processor:
32-bit variant quad-core ARM Cortex-A15 MPCore R3 + low power companion core
 or 64-bit variant with dual-core Project Denver (variant once codenamed "Stark")
 GPU consisting of 192 ALUs using Kepler technology
 28 nm HPM process
 Released in Q2 2014
 Power consumption: 8 watts

1 Unified Shaders : Texture mapping units : Render output units

2 ARM Large Physical Page Extension (LPAE) supports 1 TiB (240 bytes). The 8 GiB limitation is part-specific.

Devices 

In December 2015, the web page of wccftech.com published an article stating that Tesla is going to use a Tegra K1 based design derived from the template of the Nvidia Visual Computing Module (VCM) for driving the infotainment systems and providing visual driving aid in the respective vehicle models of that time. This news has, as of now, found no similar successor or other clear confirmation later on in any other place on such a combination of a multimedia with an auto pilot system for these vehicle models.

Tegra X1 

Released in 2015, Nvidia's Tegra X1 (codenamed "Erista") features two CPU clusters, one with four ARM Cortex-A57 cores and the other with four ARM Cortex-A53 cores, as well as a Maxwell-based graphics processing unit.
It supports Adaptive Scalable Texture Compression. Only one cluster of cores can be active at once, with the cluster switch being handled by software on the BPMP-L. Devices utilizing the Tegra X1 have only been seen to utilize the cluster with the more powerful ARM Cortex-A57 cores. The other cluster with four ARM Cortex-A53 cores cannot be accessed without first powering down the Cortex-A57 cores (both clusters must be in the CC6 off state). Nvidia has removed the ARM Cortex-A53 cores from later versions of technical documentation, implying that they have been removed from the die. The Tegra X1 was found to be vulnerable to a Fault Injection (FI) voltage glitching attack, which allowed for arbitrary code execution and homebrew software on the devices it was implemented in.

A revision (codenamed "Mariko") with greater power efficiency, known officially as Tegra X1+ was released in 2019, fixing the Fusée Gelée exploit. It's also known as T214 and T210B01.

CPU: ARMv8 ARM Cortex-A57 quad-core (64-bit) + (unused?) ARM Cortex-A53 quad-core (64-bit)
GPU: Maxwell-based 256 core GPU (Jetson Nano: only 128 cores)
MPEG-4 HEVC VP8 encoding/decoding & VP9 decoding support (Jetson Nano: encoders are H.265, H.264/Stereo, VP8, JPEG; decoders are H.265, H.264/Stereo, VP8, VP9, VC-1, MPEG-2, JPEG)
TSMC 20 nm process for the Tegra X1
TSMC 16 nm process for the Tegra X1+.
TDP:
 T210: 15 W, with average power consumption less than 10 W
 Jetson Nano: 10 W (mode 0); mode 1: 5W (only 2 CPU cores @ 918 MHz, GPU @ 640 MHz)

1 CPU frequency may be clocked differently than the maximum validated by Nvidia at the OEM's discretion

2 Unified Shaders : Texture mapping units : Render output units

3 Maximum validated amount of memory, implementation is board specific

4 Maximum validated memory bandwidth, implementation is board specific

Devices

Tegra X2 
Nvidia's Tegra X2 (codenamed "Parker") features Nvidia's own custom general-purpose ARMv8-compatible core Denver 2 as well as code-named Pascal graphics processing core with GPGPU support. The chips are made using FinFET process technology using TSMC's 16 nm FinFET+ manufacturing process.

 CPU: Nvidia Denver2 ARMv8 (64-bit) dual-core + ARMv8 ARM Cortex-A57 quad-core (64-bit)
 RAM: up to 8GB LPDDR4
 GPU: Pascal-based, 256 CUDA cores; type: GP10B

 TSMC 16 nm, FinFET process
 TDP: 7.5–15 W

1 Unified Shaders : Texture mapping units : Render output units (SM count)

Devices

Xavier 
The Xavier Tegra SoC, named after the comic book character Professor X, was announced on 28 September 2016, and by March 2019, it had been released. It contains 7 billion transistors and 8 custom ARMv8 cores, a Volta GPU with 512 CUDA cores, an open sourced TPU (Tensor Processing Unit) called DLA (Deep Learning Accelerator). It is able to encode and decode 8K Ultra HD (7680×4320). Users can configure operating modes at 10 W, 15 W, and 30 W TDP as needed and the die size is 350 mm2. Nvidia confirmed the fabrication process to be 12 nm FinFET at CES 2018.

 CPU: Nvidia custom Carmel ARMv8.2-A (64-bit), 8 cores 10-wide superscalar
 GPU: Volta-based, 512 CUDA cores with 1.4 TFLOPS; type: GV11B
 TSMC 12 nm, FinFET process
 20 TOPS DL and 160 SPECint @ 20 W; 30 TOPS DL @ 30 W (TOPS DL = Deep Learning Tera-Ops)
 20 TOPS DL via the GPU based tensor cores
 10 TOPS DL (INT8) via the DLA unit that shall achieve 5 TFLOPS (FP16)
 1.6 TOPS in the PVA unit (Programmable Vision Accelerator, for StereoDisparity/OpticalFlow/ImageProcessing)
 1.5 GPix/s in the ISP unit (Image Signal Processor, with native full-range HDR and tile processing support)
 Video processor for 1.2 GPix/s encoding and 1.8 GPix/s decode including 8k video support
 MIPI-CSI-3 with 16 lanes
 1 Gbit/s Ethernet
 10 Gbit/s Ethernet

1 Unified Shaders : Texture mapping units : Render output units (SM count, Tensor Cores)

Devices 

On the Linux Kernel Mailing List, a Tegra194 based development board with type ID "P2972-0000" got reported: The board consists of the P2888 compute module and the P2822 baseboard.

Orin 

Nvidia announced the next-gen SoC codename Orin on March 27, 2018, at GPU Technology Conference 2018. It contains 17 billion transistors and 12 Arm Hercules cores and is capable of 200 INT8 TOPs @ 65W.

The Drive AGX Orin board system family was announced on December 18, 2019, at GTC China 2019. Nvidia has sent papers to the press documenting that the known (from Xavier series) clock and voltage scaling on the semiconductors and by pairing multiple such chips a wider range of application can be realized with the thus resulting board concepts. The vehicle company NIO got announced by Nvidia for receiving a 4 Orin chip based board design for use in their cars.

The so far published specifications for Orin are:
 CPU: 12× Arm Cortex-A78AE (Hercules) ARMv8.2-A (64-bit)
 GPU: Ampere-based, 2048 CUDA cores and 64 tensor cores; "with up to 131 Sparse TOPs of INT8 Tensor compute, and up to 5.32 FP32 TFLOPs of CUDA compute."
 5.3 CUDA TFLOPs (FP32)
 10.6 CUDA TFLOPs (FP16)
 Samsung 8 nm process
 275 TOPS (INT8) DL
 170 TOPS DL (INT8) via the GPU
 105 TOPS DL (INT8) via the 2x NVDLA 2.0 units (DLA, Deep Learning Accelerator)
 85 TOPS DL (FP16)
 5 TOPS in the PVA v2.0 unit (Programmable Vision Accelerator for Feature Tracking)
 1.85 GPix/s in the ISP unit (Image Signal Processor, with native full-range HDR and tile processing support)
 Video processor for ? GPix/s encoding and ? GPix/s decode
 4× 10 Gbit/s Ethernet, 1× 1 Gbit/s Ethernet

Nvidia announced the latest member of the family, "Orin Nano" in September 2022 at the GPU Technology Conference 2022. The Orin product line now features SoC and SoM(System-On-Module) based on the core Orin design and scaled for different uses from 60W all the way down to 5W. While less is known about the exact SoC's that are being manufactured, Nvidia has publicly shared detailed technical specifications about the entire Jetson Orin SoM product line. These module specifications illustrate how Orin scales providing insight into future devices that contain an Orin derived SoC.

1 Shader Processors : Ray tracing cores : Tensor Cores (SM count, GPCs, TPCs)

Devices

Atlan (cancelled) 

Nvidia announced the next-gen SoC codename Atlan on April 12, 2021, at GPU Technology Conference 2021. Nvidia announced the cancellation of Atlan on September 20, 2022, and their next SoC will be Thor.

Functional units known so far are:
 Grace Next CPU
 Ada Lovelace GPU
 Bluefield DPU (Data Processing Unit)
 other Accelerators
 Security Engine
 Functional Safety Island
 On-Chip-Memory
 External Memory Interface(s)
 High-Speed-IO Interfaces

Thor 
Nvidia announced the next-gen SoC codename Thor on September 20, 2022, at GPU Technology Conference 2022, replacing the cancelled Atlan.

Devices 
 Nvidia DRIVE Thor

Models comparison 

* VLIW-based Vec4: Pixel shaders + Vertex shaders. Since Kepler, Unified shaders are used.

Software support

FreeBSD 
FreeBSD supports a number of different Tegra models and generations, ranging from Tegra K1, to Tegra 210.

Linux 
Nvidia distributes proprietary device drivers for Tegra through OEMs and as part of its "Linux for Tegra" (formerly "L4T") development kit, also Nvidia provides JetPack SDK with "Linux for Tegra" and other tools with it. The newer and more powerful devices of the Tegra family are now supported by Nvidia's own Vibrante Linux distribution. Vibrante comes with a larger set of Linux tools plus several Nvidia provided libraries for acceleration in the area of data processing and especially image processing for driving safety and automated driving up to the level of deep learning and neuronal networks that make e.g. heavy use of the CUDA capable accelerator blocks, and via OpenCV can make use of the NEON vector extensions of the ARM cores.

, due to different "business needs" from that of their GeForce line of graphics cards, Nvidia and one of their Embedded Partners, Avionic Design GmbH from Germany, are also working on submitting open-source drivers for Tegra upstream to the mainline Linux kernel. Nvidia co-founder & CEO laid out the Tegra processor roadmap using Ubuntu Unity in GPU Technology Conference 2013.

By end of 2018 it is evident that Nvidia employees have contributed substantial code parts to make the T186 and T194 models run for HDMI display and audio with the upcoming official Linux kernel 4.21 in about Q1 2019. The affected software modules are the open source Nouveau and the closed source Nvidia graphics drivers along with the Nvidia proprietary CUDA interface.

QNX 
The Drive PX2 board was announced with QNX RTOS support at the April 2016 GPU Technology Conference.

Similar platforms 
SoCs and platforms with comparable specifications (e.g. audio/video input, output and processing capability, connectivity, programmability, entertainment/embedded/automotive capabilities & certifications, power consumption) are:

See also 
 Project Denver
 Nomadik
 XScale
 ZiiLABS

References

External links 
 Official website
 Nvidia's Tegra APX website
 Nvidia's Tegra FAQ
 Tegra X1 Whitepaper
 Tegra K1 Whitepaper
 Tegra 4 CPU Whitepaper
 Tegra 4 GPU Whitepaper
 Tegra 3 Whitepaper
 Tegra 2 Whitepaper

ARM-based systems on chips
Mobile computers
Nvidia hardware
System on a chip